Lordship Lane was a railway station in East Dulwich, in what was the Metropolitan Borough of Camberwell in south London, on the Crystal Palace and South London Junction Railway. It was opened by the London, Chatham and Dover Railway (LCDR) in September 1865 and took its name from Lordship Lane, the thoroughfare on which it stood. It was situated a short distance from a rival London, Brighton and South Coast Railway (LBSCR) station named , which survives.

It was closed during the First World War between January 1917 and March 1919 and again during the Second World War in May 1944 after it suffered heavy bomb damage during the Blitz. The station was repaired and temporarily reopened in March 1946.

Lordship Lane was permanently closed, along with the rest of the line, in September 1954. The railway crossed London Road (just beyond the southern end of Lordship Lane itself) on a bridge and the station was just to the southwest of the road. The station was demolished shortly after closure. The site is now occupied by a residential estate.

The locality is the subject of Lordship Lane Station, Dulwich, an 1871 painting by Camille Pissarro, which now hangs at the Courtauld Institute of Art in London.

See also 
 List of closed railway stations in London

References

Further reading 
Crystal Palace (High Level) and Catford Loop by V Mitchell & K Smith, Middleton Press, 1991.
The Railway through Sydenham Hill Wood, From the Nun's Head to the Screaming Alice by Mathew Frith, The Friends of the Great North Wood and London Wildlife Trust leaflet 1995.
London's Local Railways by A A Jackson, David & Charles, 1978
The Crystal Palace (High Level) Branch by W Smith, British Railway Journal 28, 1989.

Disused railway stations in the London Borough of Southwark
Former London, Chatham and Dover Railway stations
Railway stations in Great Britain opened in 1865
Railway stations in Great Britain closed in 1917
Railway stations in Great Britain opened in 1919
Railway stations in Great Britain closed in 1944
Railway stations in Great Britain opened in 1946
Railway stations in Great Britain closed in 1954
Dulwich